Furzebrook is a small village on the Isle of Purbeck, in the county of Dorset in the south of England.

The name Furzebrook derives from the furze/gorse and a brook. The first use of the name was probably by Furzebrook Farm. Furzebrook became the centre of the clay industry as all the local Purbeck Ball Clay was taken there to ripen by exposing. The clay was repeatedly turned for six months. As the ball clay ripened it acquired plasticity and became suitable to mix with various other clays which made them more plastic.

At Furzebrook there are several narrow-gauge railway tracks; these converged from outlying local mines and claypits, the Furzebrook Railway. A further narrow-gauge line ran to Ridge Wharf.

As the Wareham to Swanage branch line of the London and South Western Railway was built it passed through Furzebrook and therefore a lot of clay was transferred via the mainline trains. Furzebrook is now well known as being the railhead for the oil extracted from the local Wytch Farm oil well.

See also 
 Blue Pool is part of the Furzebrook area
 Furzebrook Railway, also known as the Pike Brothers' Tramway

References

External links

Isle of Purbeck
Villages in Dorset